Fusebox, or variants, may refer to:

 Fuse box, or distribution board, in electric wiring
 Fuse box housing automotive fuses
 Fusebox (band), an American band
 Fusebox (programming), a web development programming framework
 Fuse Box (album), by AC/DC, 1995

See also
 Fuse (electrical)#Fuse boxes